Christopher Tulloch (born August 1946) is a British animator, musician, actor, singer-songwriter, writer and director, who has worked on children's series such as TUGS and Dream Street.

Biography

Music career
He started his music career as a founding member of the British folk rock band Frogmorton that played festivals, clubs and radio throughout the 1970s and released the album At Last in 1976 on Philips Records.

He spent some time in America before returning to the United Kingdom and started the band The Extraordinaires along with Big John Evans. During the time he was touring with The Extraordinaires, he wrote the hit single "Blue Skies" for The Jets. The Extraordinaires finally broke up in 1985; this is when he turned to film and television work.

Since retiring from teaching in the mid-2000s, he has focused his talents as a songwriter, writing and performing as Mandolin Jack. For a while from 2011 until 2013 he was the UK co-ordinator for the Nashville Songwriters Association and continues to promote songwriting in the UK with Songwriter Specials and with his own monthly radio show Songwriter Radio with Mandolin Jack on  CM Nashville Radio.

Acting career
As an animator, director and writer, he is best known for voicing the crucial antagonist part of Zorran in TUGS as well as voicing some of the Shrimpers with John Baddeley (who also voices Top Hat and Zip). He directed four of the thirteen episodes (as well as writing two episodes and serving as art director for the entire series) that currently exist today. He also served as art director with Michael Caine in St.Petersburg, Russia on Bullet to Beijing and Midnight in Saint Petersburg and as an effects technician with Steven Spielberg for Saving Private Ryan.

He formerly collaborated with the Star Tugs Pier Forum (formerly the Clearwater Forum) before the site shut down, as well as lecturing in media at East Berkshire College.

External links

 Mandolin Jack website
 Bandcamp Mandolin Jack

British animators
British animated film directors
Living people
1946 births
British folk singers
British songwriters
British television directors
British television writers
British male television writers
British male actors
British male screenwriters
British art directors
Male songwriters